Shabir Tabare Alam, known professionally as Shabir Sulthan, is a Singaporean singer-songwriter, record producer, music composer, and performer. Most of his lyrics are in Tamil. 

He won the inaugural singing competition Vasantham Star 2005, hosted by MediaCorp Vasantham TV Channel. His Yaayum song from the film Sagaa was a sleeper hit in India and around the world. 

After performing in the 2007 National Day Parade, Shabir noted there weren’t many songs performed in Tamil. He composed "Singai Naadu", a Tamil song for the 2012 National Day Parade. The Singapore Prime Minister, Lee Hsien Loong, praised the song, and Shabir won the Singapore Youth Award, the national honour the Singapore government gives young achievers. 

Shabir has starred in several Eaglevision Mediacorp and Wei Yu Films TV series. He played the lead role of Nantha, the anti-hero, in Vettai, which translates to "The Hunt.” It premiered in 2010, with wide viewership across Singapore and Malaysia. In 2011, Shabir won  Best Actor in the Pradhana Vizha Awards for his performance.  

Shabir played Vettaiyan in Naam 2, a sequel to the hit series, Naam. He also played Major Habibullah Khan, a former war hero, in a period drama This Land Is Mine. He was nominated for Best Supporting Actor for this role at the Asian Television Awards.

Personal life
Shabir was born in Singapore. His father is from Tiruvannamalai, Tamil Nadu, and speaks Urdu/Tamil.  His mother speaks Malay/Tamil. Shabir composed his first song at the age of 12.

Career

Shabir started composing when he was 12 years old. Self-taught on the keyboard, he studied Hindustani Classical Music, learning the violin from Sri Veereshwar Madhri and guitar from Steeve Vatz. Shabir ultimately received a bachelor's degree in music production and composition.

Shabir is a leading recording artist in Singapore, and he has released three albums: Alaipayuthey,  TraffiQ, and Swasam-Scents of Prose. His music has various influences, including music pop, indie, alternative rock, and world music. His lyrics include wordplay, metaphor, and experiments with cadence. His early metal and rock favorites, such as Rage Against The Machine and Metallica, have influenced his vocal style. 

Film Music

Sagaa was Shabir’s debut as a film composer, and the score received critical praise. The film's lead single, "Yaayum,” was a hit on release, receiving critical and fan acclaim. Yaayum has had over 124 million YouTube views and over 13 million Spotify streams. Shabir is the only Singaporean who scores movies in India. 

Independent Music

Shabir is a prime leader of the international Tamil music movement. His first album, "Alaipayuthey,” was released in 2005. His next album, TraffiQ (Dejavu & Nagaravaytai), was regularly played on local and international channels, including MTV Asia and Channel V, and increased his exposure throughout South East Asia.

"Swasam – Scents of Prose" produced by High Breed Media, was released on 7 April 2012. The album combined various musical styles and features poetry recitations by prominent Singaporeans, including the nation's 6th President, S.R Nathan, Minister S Iswaran, former NMP Viswa Sadasivan, and others.

Controversy
Shabir won the inaugural Vasantham Star competition in 2005, but some controversy surrounded it. 

His initial performances received mixed reviews, with focus on his pronunciation and use of slang. He made it through the quarter finals, but lost in the semifinals, angering many fans. A petition signed by over 500 people was submitted to the producers, who created a wild card entry that allowed Shabir back into the competition and his win.

Filmography/Discography 
As Playback Singer

As Film Composer

As an Independent Artist

As an Actor

Awards

 Vasantham Star 2005 (Winner)
 Derana TV Awards Best Music Video for Nagara Vaytei by Shabir ft Dinesh K & Ramya 2009 (Winner)
 Pradhana Vizha 2011 Best Actor (Winner)
 Singapore Indian Artistes Association (Honored Best Actor) 2011
 Pradhana Vizha 2012 Most Popular Song (Winner)
 Kannadasan Award 2012 by Association of Singapore Tamil Writers (Winner)
 Edison Awards 2013 Best International Singer (Winner)
 Highly Commended Award for Kshatriyan soundtrack at Asian Television Awards 2016
 Pradhana Vizha 2016 Best Soundtrack (Won for Nee Indru Kshatriyan)
 Singapore Youth Award 2017 
 Artistic Excellence Award 2022 by COMPASS
 Best Original Song for an Asian TV programme or Movie  2022 by ContentAsia Award
 Best Original Track Award for "Vettai"  by Pradhana Vizhna 2022

References

External links
 Official Facebook Fan Page – Shabir

1985 births
Living people
21st-century Singaporean male singers
Singaporean people of Tamil descent
Singaporean people of Indian descent
Tamil male television actors
Tamil television presenters
Tamil male actors
21st-century Tamil male actors
Tamil Reality dancing competition contestants